3-Chloromethamphetamine (3-CMA) is a substituted amphetamine derivative invented in the 1960s. In animal studies it was deemed to be a "hallucinogen" rather than a stimulant, though the assays used at the time did not distinguish between the compounds now termed psychedelics and those now termed empathogens.

See also
 3-Chloromethcathinone
 4-Chloromethamphetamine
 3-Fluoromethamphetamine
 3-Methoxymethamphetamine
 5-Cl-bk-MPA
 Fenfluramine

References 

Chlorobenzenes
Designer drugs
Methamphetamines
Serotonin-norepinephrine-dopamine releasing agents